The Grey Fox is a 1982 Canadian biographical Western film directed by Phillip Borsos and written by John Hunter. It is based on the true story of Bill Miner, an American stagecoach robber who staged his first Canadian train robbery on 10 September 1904. The film stars Richard Farnsworth as Miner. The cast also features Jackie Burroughs, Ken Pogue, Wayne Robson, Gary Reineke and Timothy Webber.

Plot
Stagecoach robber Bill Miner is caught and sent to prison for 33 years.  He is finally released in 1901.  He wanders around, a man out of place in the new century, until he sees one of the first films, The Great Train Robbery, and is inspired to copy it in real life.  After a couple of unsuccessful attempts, he successfully robs a train and hides from the law in a mining town in British Columbia, becoming a respectable resident. There, he meets and falls in love with early feminist and photographer Katherine Flynn.  He considers settling down with her, but one last robbery proves to be his downfall.  True to his nickname, the Grey Fox escapes from prison as the ending credits start.

Cast

Production
According to Farnsworth, the "picture company" was the only one ever allowed to film at Fort Steele, British Columbia, a heritage site. The Grey Fox was also filmed on the British Columbia Railway / Pacific Great Eastern Railway, now run by Canadian National Railway, between Pemberton and Lillooet, British Columbia, and the  Lake Whatcom Railway between Wickersham and Park, Washington. The capture sequence was shot a quarter of a mile from where Miner was actually caught. Miner's gun, "a .41 Bisley Colt", was obtained from a collector and used by Farnsworth in close-ups. 

The film was funded by selling 696 units for $5,000 each to investors, and it was edited in 1981 before a distributor was found. Phillip Borsos was paid $45,000 to direct the film. The film was shot from 7 October to 28 November 1980, and had a budget of $3,480,000, but cost $4,500,000 to make.

Release
The film was shown at the Taormina Film Fest in June 1982, and was released in Toronto on 16 December 1982. It grossed over $6 million at the box office in its first year.

Awards
The Grey Fox has been designated and preserved as a "masterwork" by the Audio-Visual Preservation Trust of Canada, a charitable non-profit organization dedicated to promoting the preservation of Canada’s audio-visual heritage.

At the 4th Genie Awards in 1983, The Grey Fox was nominated for thirteen awards and won seven:

 Best Picture
 Best Director (Borsos)
 Best Foreign Actor (Farnsworth)
 Best Supporting Actress (Burroughs)
 Best Original Screenplay (Hunter)
 Best Art Direction (Bill Brodie)
 Best Musical Score (Michael Conway Baker)

Further recognition for Farnsworth included a Golden Globe Award nomination for Best Actor in a Motion Picture – Drama.

It has also been listed in the Toronto International Film Festival's TIFF List of Canada's Top Ten Films of All Time in 1984 and 1993.

Critical reaction
Roger Ebert praised the film as "a lovely adventure" and gave it 3 stars. Rotten Tomatoes gave it a rare 100% fresh rating.

Restoration and re-release
The film underwent a 4K restoration and was re-released to theatres In April 2020. It also saw its first official release to DVD and Blu-Ray, which included a commentary by filmmaker Alex Cox, interview with producer Peter O'Brian, and a featurette about the restoration.

References

Works cited

External links
 
 
 

1982 films
1982 directorial debut films
1982 drama films
1982 Western (genre) films
Best Picture Genie and Canadian Screen Award winners
Biographical films about people of the American Old West
Canadian Western (genre) films
Canadian drama films
English-language Canadian films
1980s English-language films
Films directed by Phillip Borsos
Films set in Vancouver
Films shot in Vancouver
Rail transport films
1980s American films
1980s Canadian films